Write This Down may refer to:

 Write This Down (band), an American Christian rock band from Minneapolis, Minnesota
 Write This Down (album), the debut album by the aforementioned band
 "Write This Down" (EP), an extended play by the aforementioned band
 "Write This Down" (song), a single by American country-music singer George Strait